Nios II is a 32-bit embedded processor architecture designed specifically for the Altera family of field-programmable gate array (FPGA) integrated circuits. Nios II incorporates many enhancements over the original Nios architecture, making it more suitable for a wider range of embedded computing applications, from digital signal processing (DSP) to system-control.

Nios II is a successor to Altera's first configurable 16-bit embedded processor Nios, introduced in 2000.

Key features
Like the original Nios, the Nios II architecture is a RISC soft-core architecture which is implemented entirely in the programmable logic and memory blocks of Altera FPGAs. Unlike its predecessor it is a full 32-bit design:

 32 general-purpose 32-bit registers,
 Full 32-bit instruction set, data path, and address space,
 Single-instruction 32 × 32 multiply and divide producing a 32-bit result.

The soft-core nature of the Nios II processor lets the system designer specify and generate a custom Nios II core, tailored for his or her specific application requirements. System designers can extend the Nios II's basic functionality by adding a predefined memory management unit, or defining custom instructions and custom peripherals.

Custom instructions 
Similar to native Nios II instructions, user-defined instructions accept values from up to two 32-bit source registers and optionally write back a result to a 32-bit destination register. By using custom instructions, the system designers can fine-tune the system hardware to meet performance goals and also the designer can easily handle the instruction as a macro in C.

Custom peripherals 
For performance-critical systems that spend most CPU cycles executing a specific section of code, a user-defined peripheral can potentially offload part or all of the execution of a software-algorithm to user-defined hardware logic, improving power-efficiency or application throughput.

Memory Management Unit 
Introduced with Quartus 8.0, the optional MMU enables Nios II to run operating systems which require hardware-based paging and protection, such as the Linux kernel. Without an MMU, Nios is restricted to operating systems which use a simplified protection and virtual memory-model: e.g., µClinux and FreeRTOS.

Memory Protection Unit 
Introduced with Quartus 8.0, the optional MPU provides memory protection similar to that provided by an MMU but with a simpler programming model and without the performance overhead associated with an MMU.

Nios II CPU family 
Nios II classic is offered in 3 different configurations: Nios II/f (fast), Nios II/s (standard), and Nios II/e (economy).
Nios II gen2 is offered in 2 different configurations: Nios II/f (fast), and Nios II/e (economy).

Nios II/f 
The Nios II/f core is designed for maximum performance at the expense of core size. Features of Nios II/f include:
 Separate instruction and data caches (512 B to 64 KB)
 Optional MMU or MPU
 Access to up to 2 GB of external address space
 Optional tightly coupled memory for instructions and data
 Six-stage pipeline to achieve maximum DMIPS/MHz
 Single-cycle hardware multiply and barrel shifter
 Optional hardware divide option
 Dynamic branch prediction
 Up to 256 custom instructions and unlimited hardware accelerators
 JTAG debug module
 Optional JTAG debug module enhancements, including hardware breakpoints, data triggers, and real-time trace

Nios II/s 
Nios II/s core is designed to maintain a balance between performance and cost. This core implementation is not longer supported for Altera Quartus II v.17 and newer. Features of Nios II/s include:
 Instruction cache
 Up to 2 GB of external address space
 Optional tightly coupled memory for instructions
 Five-stage pipeline
 Static branch prediction
 Hardware multiply, divide, and shift options
 Up to 256 custom instructions
 JTAG debug module
 Optional JTAG debug module enhancements, including hardware breakpoints, data triggers, and real-time trace

Nios II/e 
The Nios II/e core is designed for smallest possible logic utilization of FPGAs. This is especially efficient for low-cost Cyclone II FPGA applications. Features of Nios II/e include:
 Up to 2 GB of external address space
 JTAG debug module
 Complete systems in fewer than 700 LEs
 Optional debug enhancements
 Up to 256 custom instructions
 Free, no license required

Avalon switch fabric interface 

Nios II uses the Avalon switch fabric as the interface to its embedded peripherals. Compared to a traditional bus in a processor-based system, which lets only one bus master access the bus at a time, the Avalon switch fabric, using a slave-side arbitration scheme, lets multiple masters operate simultaneously.

Development processes 
Development for Nios II consists of two separate steps: hardware generation and software creation.

Development is hosted inside an Altera application called the Embedded Design Suite (EDS). The EDS contains a complete integrated development environment to manage both hardware and software in two separate steps:

Hardware generation process 
Nios II hardware designers use the Qsys system integration tool, a component of the Quartus-II package, to configure and generate a Nios system. The configuration graphical user interface (GUI) allows users to choose the Nios-II's feature-set, and to add peripheral and I/O-blocks (timers, memory-controllers, serial interface, etc.) to the embedded system. When the hardware specification is complete, Quartus-II performs the synthesis, place & route to implement the entire system on the selected FPGA target.
Qsys is replacing the older SOPC (System-on-a-Programmable-Chip) Builder, which could also be used to build a Nios II system, and is being recommended for new projects.

Software creation process 
A separate package, called the Embedded Design Suite (EDS), manages the software development. Based on the Eclipse IDE, the EDS includes a C/C++ compiler (based on the GNU toolchain), debugger, and an instruction-set simulator. EDS allows programmers to test their application in simulation, or download and run their compiled application on the actual FPGA host.

Because the C/C++ development-chain is based on GCC, the vast majority of open source software for Linux compiles and runs with minimal or no modification. Third-party operating-systems have also been ported to Nios II. These include Micrium MicroC/OS-II, eCos, Segger Microcontroller embOS, ChibiOS/RT, μCLinux and FreeRTOS.

Licensing 
Nios II is comparable to MicroBlaze, a competing softcore CPU for the Xilinx family of FPGA. Unlike MicroBlaze, Nios II is licensable for standard-cell ASICs through a third-party IP provider, Synopsys Designware. Through the Designware license, designers can port Nios-based designs from an FPGA-platform to a mass production ASIC-device.

See also 

 LatticeMico8
 LatticeMico32
 MicroBlaze
 PicoBlaze
 Micon P200

References

External links 
Intel's site about Nios II
Nios II Embedded Design Suite forum
Nios community wiki
RTEMS real-time operating system
Cornell ECE576 Microcontroller course using NiosII
FreeRTOS demo documentation for NiosII
UPB ECE31289 course using Nios II

Soft microprocessors